The Apere River is a river of Bolivia. It is a tributary of the Mamoré River, in the Department of Beni.

See also
List of rivers of Bolivia

References
Rand McNally, The New International Atlas, 1993.

Rivers of Beni Department